Glen Canyon Dam, a concrete arch dam on the Colorado River in the American state of Arizona, is viewed as carrying a large amount of risk, most notably due to siltation. The Colorado and San Juan rivers deposit large volumes of silt into Lake Powell, slowly decreasing its capacity. The sediment will eventually build up against the dam and could affect its safe operation and lead to its failure.

The dam, anchored in unstable Navajo sandstone (sometimes said to be "solidified sand dunes"), nearly failed in 1983 as the result of a flood on the upper Colorado River that led to extended use of its tunnel spillways. The spillways, designed for short-term use, soon underwent cavitation and began to fail. Emergency installation of  flashboards and other efforts narrowly averted total failure.

Siltation, concrete degradation, spillway operational problems, and unstable dam abutments are all key factors that affect the safe operation of the dam. It is estimated that a breach of the dam would produce a floodwave that would overtop the Hoover Dam. The dam's useful lifespan has been estimated by some to be 85 to 100 years, and was described as "America's most regretted environmental mistake" by David Brower, then-head of the Sierra Club. Different estimates by the Bureau of Reclamation and others suggest a lifespan of between 500–700 years.

Overview

Glen Canyon Dam is a concrete arch dam on the Colorado River in northern Arizona in the United States, just north of Page. The dam was built to provide hydroelectricity and regulate the flow of the river from the upper Colorado River Basin into the lower. The  Lake Powell reservoir is the second largest artificial lake in the country, extending upriver well into Utah. The dam is named for Glen Canyon, a colorful series of gorges, most of which now are buried under the reservoir.

Construction of Glen Canyon Dam began in 1956 and was finished in 1966. When the reservoir filled, the dam began to deliver a steady, regulated flow of water downstream and generate a cheap, plentiful supply of electricity. In 1983, major floods nearly destroyed the two tunnel spillways that could have led to the dam's collapse, but disaster was averted by a close margin. By taming floods that were characteristic of the Colorado River, the dam has led to major physical and ecological changes in the lower river. Controversy continues over  the positive and negative effects of the dam.

Siltation

The Colorado River carries an estimated 45 million tons of sediment annually at Glen Canyon, and as Lake Powell is the farthest large reservoir upstream on the Colorado River mainstem, the sediment load is completely trapped in the reservoir as the Colorado discharges into it. This sediment is creating a steadily advancing "toe" of sediment, i.e. an underwater alluvial fan, that is advancing towards the dam. Some estimates by conservationists predict that the sediment will reach the dam base in about 80 to 100  years, while others made primarily by government agencies estimate it will take as long as 500 to 700 years. It will take still longer for the sediment to accumulate to the  point where it could clog the outlet works, which are the lowest openings in the upstream face of the dam.

Some critics predict that if the water level then drops, it may fall below the penstock openings, which are higher up on the dam face, which will cause the release capacity of the dam to drop to zero. This would dewater the Colorado River bed below the dam which would remain dry until the next major spring inflow. Only springs, seeps and tributaries such as the Paria, Little Colorado and Virgin River would supply the river flow during these times, perhaps causing unprecedented drops in levels of Lake Mead as well.

The primary failure mode for Glen Canyon dam will likely be an overtopping one spring caused by insufficient storage capacity (either a huge inflow, bigger than 1983, or insufficient storage capacity because the lake was too full of either water or sediment).

An example of the fast deposition rate of Colorado River sediment is found in Lake Mead itself, where, before the completion of Glen Canyon Dam, ten percent of its storage was already compromised by sediment. When Lake Powell levels drop, sediments deposited in its upper reaches are carried into the receding water by the Colorado and its tributaries. One large flash flood caused by heavy rainfall could move all or most of these sediments into Lake Powell, creating a sudden loss of storage capacity. One way to control sediment flow in the reservoir, without removing the dam outright, is by dredging.

1983–84 flooding

In May 1983, three years after Lake Powell was first filled, an unusually long-lasting winter due to the 1982–83 El Niño event produced increased snowfall over the entire  multi-state Colorado River basin. Dam engineers anticipated a normal winter, and maintained reservoir levels at their usual levels through the winter.

Inflow capacity

Spring ended with a sudden influx of warm weather and then rain.

Outflow capacity

Glen Canyon Dam has two tunnel spillways capable of allowing  to bypass the dam's regular spillways. The spillway tunnels were excavated around both abutments of the dam, dropping steeply from their control gates on Lake Powell to connect with the lower reaches of the diversion tunnels, which were utilized as the lower ends of the dam's spillways. This measure saved cost, but introduced a weak point at the elbow where the two tunnels intersected. The upper ends of the diversion tunnels were then sealed with a solid concrete "plug".

Tunnel spillways damaged 

At first, as inflows exceeded normal levels, the US Bureau of Reclamation engineers opened penstocks to full release. When  inflow rates continued to rise, they also opened the river outlet works. The reservoir continued to rise.

At that level they feared they could not control the spillway gates. The engineers decided to raise the floodgates controlling the tunnel spillways. This became the first time that the spillways had ever been used for their intended purpose. After several days, noticeable vibrations were felt in the dam wall and surrounding rock. Water exiting the spillways contained noticeable debris, including sandstone, signaling severe erosion taking place within the tunnels.

Reclamation responded by reducing releases by half, however, the rumblings continued. The noise was so noticeable that a worker in the employee dining room, located near the power plant, reported that it "sounded like the barrages that he had experienced in Vietnam". The engineers soon closed the spillways for an inspection.

Cavitation damage found

Inspection crews were lowered down the spillway tunnels in a small cart to assess damage. They found that cavitation, a known risk associated with tunnel spillways, had severely damaged and eroded the -thick concrete tunnel lining. In some locations the cavitation had  exposed the soft sandstone.

The tunnels could not be kept closed as more rain fell in the Colorado River Basin and the reservoir continued to rise.

Emergency flashboards installed

As the reservoir level increased, plywood flashboards were installed on top of the spillway gates. They allowed reservoir water to rise  without increasing releases.

Tunnels damaged further

The left tunnel, however, was suffering further damage, described as a "surging, boiling flow that filled the portal". The tunnel had  formed a hydraulic jump as it was turned into a "pressure conduit" by the surging flow of water. The interior erosion threatened to collapse the tunnel. Engineers knew that increasing the flow would decrease the turbulence but would further damage to the tunnel walls. To increase the reservoir's capacity further, engineers began an emergency effort to add  to the height of the spillway gates, avoiding increasing the rate of water releases.

Diversion tunnel threatened 

The force of the water at the left tunnel eroded concrete near the diversion plug, a device that blocked the diversion tunnel used during construction. The Bureau of Reclamation was concerned that the water would eventually erode the diversion plug altogether, creating a connection to the reservoir floor. This uncontrolled spillage would cause the reservoir to drain, creating a catastrophe.

Lake Powell reaches peak level

The water held steady for a few days and then gradually declined. As inflow lessened at the end of the season, dam engineers were able to draw Lake Powell down below critical levels.

Tunnel spillways seriously damaged

Inspections of both spillways found severe damage.

Repairs and solutions 

After the flood, it was suggested that the flashboards atop the spillway gates should be replaced with stronger boards and kept permanently; this would allow an "insurance" against a 1983-reminiscent flood.

Air slots added to tunnels

Research by the Bureau of Reclamation found that an air slot at a specific point in each spillway tunnel would introduce air bubbles that would prevent cavitation and resultant shockwaves. Spillway upgrades and repairs commenced immediately after the 1983 floods receded and continued through the winter of 1983–84. Through the winter, heavy snowpack was reported in the upper Colorado basin.

1984 floods possible

The engineers allowed Lake Powell's level to fall to allow for the next winter's snowmelt. When the  snowpack began to melt in spring of 1984, water levels reached several inches below the top of the flashboards in late June. As summer continued, inflows decreased and the reservoir level began to decrease.

On August 12, 1984, construction teams completed repairs to the left spillway. No noticeable damage was found in the spillways.

Aftermath

The 1983 flood, although it nearly caused a catastrophic disaster, was a "relatively small flood". It was, in fact, only a 25-year flood, or a flood that has a four percent chance of occurring in any given year.

Impact of dam failure

In 1990, the Bureau of Reclamation prepared a study of a Glen Canyon Dam failure. Downstream communities and possibly every dam along the river, including Hoover Dam forming Lake Mead, Davis Dam forming Lake Mohave, Parker Dam forming Lake Havasu, Palo Verde Dam, and other dams and reservoirs, as well as riverside lowlands, would be inundated or severely damaged. The resulting flood would scour the bottom few hundred feet of the Grand Canyon.

Glen Canyon Dam is the central element of the Colorado River Storage Project. If it failed, the resulting damage could limit or completely cut off water supply to residences or farmlands along the Colorado River, and depending on damage to canal headworks, even cut off water to southern California.

References

External links

 Controlled Flooding of the Colorado River in Grand Canyon from Glen Canyon Dam
 Hydrology analysis of the Colorado River floods of 1983

Glen
Glen Canyon National Recreation Area
Glen
Glen